Amazoromus is a genus of South American ground spiders that was first described by Antônio Brescovit & H. Höfer in 1994.

Species
 it contains four species, all found in Brazil:
Amazoromus becki Brescovit & Höfer, 1994 – Brazil
Amazoromus cristus (Platnick & Höfer, 1990) – Brazil
Amazoromus janauari Brescovit & Höfer, 1994 – Brazil
Amazoromus kedus Brescovit & Höfer, 1994 (type) – Brazil

References

Araneomorphae genera
Gnaphosidae
Spiders of Brazil
Taxa named by Antônio Brescovit